Tank plinking is the military practice of using precision-guided munitions to destroy artillery, armored personnel carriers, tanks, and other targets. The term was coined by pilots during the Gulf War, but discouraged by the military. As the war progressed, the term began to encompass all forms of destroying a target with an excessively capable weapon. 

General Norman Schwarzkopf was looking for a plan to incapacitate 50% of the Iraqi army before any ground invasion could begin. Planning was performed including high intensity air strikes with General Dynamics F-111, A-6 Intruder, F-15E Strike Eagle, F/A-18 Hornet, AV-8 Harrier, A-10 Thunderbolt II, and F-16 Falcon crews. This culminated in December 1990, with Operation Night Camel in which air crews of the F-111 evaluated the ability of aircraft to use guided munitions with the LANTIRN and Pave Tack target designation systems from medium altitude.

This is a deviation from standard military air engagement.  Due to the prevalence of surface-to-air missiles, most aviators would prefer to engage a target from either a very high altitude, or a very low altitude, and certainly with low observability aircraft. However, the Iraqi defenses proved very inadequate. The winning combination for the eventual campaign was either a pair or quartet of F-111F aircraft loaded with four GBU-12 , laser-guided bombs. Bombs were designated for entrenched, hard targets, and for softer targets (e.g. armoured personnel carriers).

References 

Military slang and jargon
Gulf War